Light-Hearted Isabel is a 1927 German silent comedy film directed by Eddy Busch and Arthur Wellin and starring Lee Parry, Otto Wallburg, and Gustav Fröhlich. The film's sets were designed by the art directors Otto Erdmann and Hans Sohnle.

Cast

References

Bibliography

External links

1927 films
Films of the Weimar Republic
Films directed by Arthur Wellin
German silent feature films
German comedy films
German black-and-white films
1927 comedy films
Silent comedy films
1920s German films
1920s German-language films